Robert Charles Durman Mitchum (August 6, 1917 – July 1, 1997) was an American actor. He is known for his antihero roles and film noir appearances. He received nominations for an Academy Award, and a BAFTA Award. He received a star on the Hollywood Walk of Fame in 1984 and the Golden Globe Cecil B. DeMille Award in 1992. Mitchum is rated number 23 on the American Film Institute's list of the greatest male stars of classic American cinema.

He rose to prominence with an Academy Award nomination for the Best Supporting Actor for The Story of G.I. Joe (1945). His best-known films include Thirty Seconds Over Tokyo (1944),   Out of the Past (1947), River of No Return (1954), The Night of the Hunter (1955), Thunder Road (1958), Cape Fear (1962), El Dorado (1966), Ryan's Daughter (1970) and The Friends of Eddie Coyle (1973). He is also known for his television role as U.S. Navy Captain Victor "Pug" Henry in the epic miniseries The Winds of War (1983) and sequel War and Remembrance (1988).

Roger Ebert called Mitchum his favorite movie star and the soul of film noir: "With his deep, laconic voice and his long face and those famous weary eyes, he was the kind of guy you'd picture in a saloon at closing time, waiting for someone to walk in through the door and break his heart." David Thomson wrote that "Since the war, no American actor has made so many different first-class films, in so many different moods."

Early life

Mitchum was born in Bridgeport, Connecticut, on August 6, 1917, into a Methodist family of English-Scottish-Irish and Norwegian descent. His father, James Thomas Mitchum, a shipyard and railroad worker, was of English-Scottish-Irish descent, and his mother, Ann Harriet Gunderson, was a Norwegian immigrant and sea captain's daughter. His older sister, Annette (known as Julie Mitchum during her acting career), was born in 1914. James was crushed to death in a railyard accident in Charleston, South Carolina, in February 1919. His widow was awarded a government pension, and soon realized she was pregnant. Her third child, John, was born in September of that year.

Ann married Lieutenant Hugh "The Major" Cunningham Morris, a former Royal Naval Reserve officer. They had a daughter, Carol Morris, born July 1927 on the family farm in Delaware. When all of the children were old enough to attend school, Ann found employment as a linotype operator for the Bridgeport Post.

As a child, Mitchum was known as a prankster, often involved in fistfights and mischief. In 1929 his mother sent the twelve-year-old Mitchum to live with her parents in Felton, Delaware; the boy was promptly expelled from middle school for scuffling with the principal. A year later he moved in with his older sister in Manhattan's Hell's Kitchen. After being expelled from Haaren High School he left his sister and traveled throughout the country, hopping freight cars and taking a number of jobs, including ditch-digging for the Civilian Conservation Corps and professional boxing. He later stated that at age 14 in Savannah, Georgia, he was arrested for vagrancy and put in a local chain gang. By Mitchum's account, he escaped and returned to his family in Delaware. At the age of 16, while recovering from injuries that nearly cost him a leg, he met 14 year old Dorothy Spence, whom he would later marry. He soon went back on the road, eventually "riding the rails" to California.

Acting career

Getting established

In the mid-1930s Julie Mitchum moved to the West Coast in the hope of acting in movies, and the rest of the Mitchum family soon followed her to Long Beach, California.  Robert arrived in 1936. During this time, Mitchum worked as a ghostwriter for astrologer Carroll Righter. Julie persuaded him to join the local theater guild with her.  At The Players Guild of Long Beach, Mitchum worked as a stagehand and occasional bit-player in company productions. He also wrote several short pieces which were performed by the guild. According to Lee Server's biography (Robert Mitchum: Baby, I Don't Care), Mitchum put his talent for poetry to work writing song lyrics and monologues for Julie's nightclub performances.

In 1940, he returned to Delaware to marry Dorothy Spence, and they moved back to California. He gave up his artistic pursuits at the birth of their first child James, nicknamed Josh, and two more children, Chris and Petrine, followed. Mitchum found steady employment as a machine operator during World War II with the Lockheed Aircraft Corporation, but the noise of the machinery damaged his hearing. He also suffered a nervous breakdown (which resulted in temporary vision problems), due to job-related stress.

He then sought work as a film actor, performing initially as an extra and in small speaking parts. His agent got him an interview with Harry Sherman, the producer of Paramount's Hopalong Cassidy western film series, which starred William Boyd; Mitchum was hired to play minor villainous roles in several films in the series during 1942 and 1943. He went uncredited as a soldier in the 1943 film The Human Comedy starring Mickey Rooney. His first on-screen credit came in 1943 as a Marine private in the Randolph Scott war film Gung Ho! Mitchum continued to find work as an extra and supporting actor in numerous productions for various studios.

After impressing director Mervyn LeRoy during the making of Thirty Seconds Over Tokyo, Mitchum signed a seven-year contract with RKO Radio Pictures. He was groomed for B-Western stardom in a series of Zane Grey adaptations. Following the moderately successful Western Nevada, RKO lent Mitchum to United Artists for a prominent supporting actor role in The Story of G.I. Joe (1945). In the film, he portrayed war-weary officer Bill Walker (based on Captain Henry T. Waskow), who remains resolute despite the troubles he faces. The film, which followed the life of an ordinary soldier through the eyes of journalist Ernie Pyle (played by Burgess Meredith), became an instant critical and commercial success. Shortly after filming, Mitchum was drafted into the United States Army, serving at Fort MacArthur, California, as a medic. At the 1946 Academy Awards, The Story of G.I. Joe was nominated for four Oscars, including Mitchum's only nomination for an Academy Award, for  Best Supporting Actor. He finished the year with a Western (West of the Pecos) and a story of returning Marine veterans (Till the End of Time), before migrating to a genre that came to define Mitchum's career and screen persona: film noir.

Film noir

Mitchum was initially known for his work in film noir. His first foray into the genre was a supporting role in the 1944 B-movie When Strangers Marry, about newlyweds and a New York City serial killer. Another early noir, Undercurrent, featured him as a troubled, sensitive man entangled in the affairs of his tycoon brother (Robert Taylor) and his brother's suspicious wife (Katharine Hepburn). John Brahm's The Locket (1946) featured Mitchum as a bitter ex-boyfriend to Laraine Day's femme fatale. Raoul Walsh's Pursued (1947) combined the Western and noir genres, with Mitchum's character attempting to recall his past and find those responsible for killing his family. Crossfire (also 1947) featured Mitchum as a member of a group of returned World War II soldiers embroiled in a murder investigation for an act committed by an anti-Semite in their ranks. The film, directed by Edward Dmytryk and starring (in order of billing) Robert Young, Mitchum and Robert Ryan, earned five Academy Award nominations.

Following Crossfire, Mitchum starred in Out of the Past (also called Build My Gallows High), directed by Jacques Tourneur and featuring the cinematography of Nicholas Musuraca. In his best-known noir role, Mitchum played Jeff Markham, a small-town gas-station owner and former investigator, whose unfinished business with gambler Whit Sterling (Kirk Douglas) and femme fatale Kathie Moffett (Jane Greer) comes back to haunt him.

On September 1, 1948, after a string of successful films for RKO, Mitchum and actress Lila Leeds were arrested for possession of marijuana. The bust was the result of a sting operation designed to capture other Hollywood partiers as well, but Mitchum and Leeds did not receive the tipoff. After serving a week at the county jail (he described the experience to a reporter as being "like Palm Springs, but without the riff-raff"), Mitchum spent 43 days (February 16 to March 30) at a Castaic, California, prison farm. Life  photographers were permitted to take photos of him mopping up in his prison uniform. The arrest inspired the exploitation film She Shoulda Said No! (1949), which starred Leeds.  Mitchum's conviction was later overturned by the Los Angeles court and district attorney's office on January 31, 1951, after being exposed as a setup.

Despite Mitchum's legal troubles and problems without his studio, his popularity was not harmed and films released immediately after his arrest were box-office hits. Rachel and the Stranger (1948) featured Mitchum in a supporting role as a mountain man competing for the hand of Loretta Young, the indentured servant and wife of William Holden. In the film adaptation of John Steinbeck's novella The Red Pony (1949), he appeared as a trusted cowhand to a ranching family.

Mainstream stardom in the 1950s and 1960s

In Where Danger Lives (1950), Mitchum played a doctor who comes between a mentally unbalanced Faith Domergue and cuckolded Claude Rains. The Racket was a noir remake of the early crime drama  The Racket  (1928), and featured Mitchum as a police captain fighting corruption in his precinct. The Josef von Sternberg film, Macao (1952), had Mitchum as a victim of mistaken identity at an exotic resort casino, playing opposite Jane Russell. Otto Preminger's Angel Face was the first of three collaborations between Mitchum and British stage actress Jean Simmons. Mitchum plays an  ambulance driver who allows a murderously insane heiress to fatally seduce him.

Mitchum was fired from Blood Alley (1955) over his conduct, reportedly having thrown the film's transportation manager into San Francisco Bay. According to Sam O'Steen's memoir Cut to the Chase, Mitchum showed up on-set after a night of drinking and tore apart a studio office when they did not have a car ready for him. Mitchum walked off the set of the third day of filming Blood Alley, claiming he could not work with the director. Because Mitchum was showing up late and behaving erratically, producer John Wayne, after failing to obtain Humphrey Bogart as a replacement, took over the role himself.

Based on a novel by Davis Grubb, the thriller starred Mitchum as a monstrous criminal posing as a preacher to find money hidden by his cellmate in the man's home. His performance as Reverend Harry Powell is considered by many to be one of the best of his career. Stanley Kramer's melodrama Not as a Stranger, also released in 1955, was a box-office hit. The film starred Mitchum against type, as an idealistic young doctor, who marries an older nurse (Olivia de Havilland), only to question his morality many years later. However, the film was not well received, with most critics pointing out that Mitchum, Frank Sinatra, and Lee Marvin were all too old for their characters. Olivia de Havilland received top billing over Mitchum and Sinatra.

On March 8, 1955, Mitchum formed DRM (Dorothy and Robert Mitchum) Productions to produce five films for United Artists; four films were produced. The first film was Bandido (1956). Following a succession of average Westerns and the poorly received Foreign Intrigue (1956), Mitchum starred in the first of three films with Deborah Kerr. The John Huston war drama Heaven Knows, Mr. Allison, cast Mitchum as a Marine corporal shipwrecked on a Pacific Island with a nun, Sister Angela (Deborah Kerr), as his sole companion. In this character study they struggle with the elements, the Japanese garrison, and their growing feelings for one another. The film was nominated for two Academy Awards, including Best Actress and Best Adapted Screenplay. For his role, Mitchum was nominated for a BAFTA Award for Best Foreign Actor. In the World War II submarine classic The Enemy Below (1956), Mitchum played the captain of a US Navy destroyer who matches wits with a wily German U-boat captain Curt Jurgens, both men would also appear in the 1962 World War II epic The Longest Day.

Thunder Road (1958), the second DRM Production, was loosely based on an incident in which a driver transporting moonshine was said to have fatally crashed on Kingston Pike in Knoxville, Tennessee, somewhere between Bearden Hill and Morrell Road. According to Metro Pulse writer Jack Renfro, the incident occurred in 1952 and may have been witnessed by James Agee, who passed the story on to Mitchum. He starred, produced, co-wrote the screenplay, and is rumored to have directed much of the film. It costars his son James, as his on-screen brother, in a role originally intended for Elvis Presley. Mitchum also co-wrote (with Don Raye) the theme song, "The Ballad of Thunder Road."

Mitchum returned to Mexico for The Wonderful Country (1959) with Julie London, and Ireland for A Terrible Beauty/The Night Fighters for the last of his DRM Productions.

Mitchum and Kerr reunited for the Fred Zinnemann film The Sundowners (1960), playing an Australian husband and wife struggling in the sheep industry during the Depression. The film received five Oscar nominations, and Mitchum earned the year's National Board of Review award for Best Actor for his performance. The award also recognized his performance in the Vincente Minnelli rural drama Home from the Hill (also 1960). He was teamed with former leading ladies Kerr and Simmons, as well as Cary Grant, for the Stanley Donen comedy The Grass Is Greener the same year.

Mitchum's performance as the menacing rapist Max Cady in Cape Fear (1962) brought him further renown for playing cold, predatory characters. The 1960s were marked by a number of lesser films. He was one of the all-star husbands of Shirley MacLaine in the comedy   What a Way to Go! (1964), the drunken sheriff in the Howard Hawks Western El Dorado (1967), a quasi-remake of Rio Bravo (1959), and another WWII epic, Anzio (1968). He co-starred with Dean Martin in the 1968 Western 5 Card Stud, playing a homicidal preacher.

Later work

Mitchum made a departure from his typical screen persona with the 1970 David Lean film Ryan's Daughter, in which he starred as Charles Shaughnessy, a mild-mannered schoolmaster in World War I–era Ireland. At the time of filming, Mitchum's recent films had been critical and commercial flops, and he was going through a personal crisis that had him considering  suicide. Screenwriter Robert Bolt told him that he could do so after the film was finished and that he would personally pay for his burial. Though the film was nominated for four Academy Awards (winning two) and Mitchum was much publicized as a contender for a Best Actor nomination, he was not nominated. George C. Scott won the award for his powerful performance in Patton, a project Mitchum had rejected as glorifying war.

The 1970s featured Mitchum in a number of well-received crime dramas. The Friends of Eddie Coyle (1973) had the actor playing an aging Boston hoodlum caught between the Feds and his criminal friends. Sydney Pollack's The Yakuza (1974) transplanted the typical  story arc to the Japanese underworld. He also appeared in 1976's Midway about a crucial 1942 World War II battle. Mitchum's stint as an aging Philip Marlowe in the Raymond Chandler adaptation Farewell, My Lovely (1975) (a remake of 1944's Murder My Sweet) was sufficiently well received by audiences and critics for him to reprise the role in 1978's The Big Sleep, a remake of the 1946 film of the same title.

In 1982, Mitchum played Coach Delaney in the film adaptation of playwright/actor Jason Miller's 1973 Pulitzer Prize-winning play That Championship Season.

Mitchum expanded to television work with the 1983 miniseries The Winds of War. The big-budget Herman Wouk story aired on ABC, starring Mitchum as naval officer "Pug" Henry and Victoria Tennant as Pamela Tudsbury, and examined the events leading up to America's involvement in World War II. He returned to the role in 1988's War and Remembrance, which continued the story through the end of the war.

In 1984, Mitchum entered the Betty Ford Center in Palm Springs, California for treatment of alcoholism.

He played George Hazard's father-in-law in the 1985 miniseries North and South, which also aired on ABC.

Mitchum starred opposite Wilford Brimley in the 1986 made-for-TV movie Thompson's Run. A hardened con (Mitchum), being transferred from a federal penitentiary to a Texas institution to finish a life sentence as a habitual criminal, is freed at gunpoint by his niece (played by Kathleen York). The cop (Brimley) who was transferring him, and has been the con's lifelong friend and adversary for over 30 years, vows to catch the twosome.

In 1987, Mitchum was the guest host on Saturday Night Live, where he played private eye Philip Marlowe for the last time in the parody sketch, "Death Be Not Deadly." The show ran a short comedy film he made (written and directed by his daughter, Trina) called Out of Gas, a mock sequel to Out of the Past (Jane Greer reprised her role from the original film). He also was in Richard Donner's 1988 comedy Scrooged.

In 1991, Mitchum was given a lifetime achievement award from the National Board of Review of Motion Pictures; in the same year, he received the Telegatto award and, in 1992, the Cecil B. DeMille Award from the Golden Globe Awards.

Mitchum continued to appear in films until the mid-1990s, such as Jim Jarmusch's Dead Man, and he narrated the Western Tombstone. In contrast to his role as the antagonist in the original, he played the protagonist police detective in Martin Scorsese's remake of Cape Fear, but the actor gradually slowed his workload. His last film appearance was a small but pivotal role in the television biographical film, James Dean: Race with Destiny, playing Giant director George Stevens. Mitchum's last starring role was in the 1995 Norwegian movie Pakten.

Music

One of the lesser-known aspects of Mitchum's career was his foray into music as a singer. Critic Greg Adams writes, "Unlike most celebrity vocalists, Robert Mitchum actually had musical talent." Mitchum's voice was often used instead of that of a professional singer when his character sang in his films. Notable productions featuring Mitchum's own singing voice included Rachel and the Stranger, River of No Return, and The Night of the Hunter. After hearing traditional calypso music and meeting artists such as Mighty Sparrow and Lord Invader while filming Heaven Knows, Mr. Allison in the Caribbean islands of Tobago, he recorded Calypso – is like so ... in March 1957. On the album, released through Capitol Records, he emulated the calypso sound and style, even adopting the style's unique pronunciations and slang. A year later, he recorded a song he had written for Thunder Road, titled "The Ballad of Thunder Road". The country-style song became a modest hit for Mitchum, reaching number 69 on the Billboard Pop Singles chart. The song was included as a bonus track on a successful reissue of Calypso ... and helped market the film to a wider audience.

Although Mitchum continued to use his singing voice in his film work, he waited until 1967 to record his follow-up record, That Man, Robert Mitchum, Sings. The album, released by Nashville-based Monument Records, took him further into country music, and featured songs similar to "The Ballad of Thunder Road". "Little Old Wine Drinker Me", the first single, was a top-10 hit at country radio, reaching number nine there, and crossed over onto mainstream radio, where it peaked at number 96. Its follow-up, "You Deserve Each Other", also charted on the Billboard Country Singles chart. He sang the title song to the Western Young Billy Young, made in 1969.

Albums

Singles

Personal life and death

Mitchum's sons, James and Christopher, were actors, and his daughter, Petrine Day Mitchum, a writer. His grandchildren, Bentley Mitchum and Carrie Mitchum, are actors, as was his younger brother, John, who died in 2001. Another grandson, Kian, is a successful model.

Mitchum was a Republican who campaigned for Barry Goldwater in the 1964 United States presidential election, and considered him to be the only honest politician. According to a 2012 interview with his son Chris, conducted by Breitbart News, Mitchum also supported Ronald Reagan and George H. W. Bush in 1992.

A lifelong heavy smoker, Mitchum died on July 1, 1997, five weeks before his 80th birthday, in Santa Barbara, California, from complications of lung cancer and emphysema. His body was cremated and his ashes scattered at sea, though there is a plot marker in the Odd Fellows Cemetery in Delaware. He was survived by his wife of 57 years, Dorothy Mitchum (May 2, 1919 – April 12, 2014, Santa Barbara, California, aged 94).

Controversies 
At the premiere for That Championship Season, Mitchum, while intoxicated, assaulted a female reporter and threw a basketball that he was holding (a prop from the film) at a female photographer from Time magazine, injuring her neck and knocking out two of her teeth. She sued him for $30 million for damages. The suit eventually "cost him his salary from the film".

That Championship Season may have indirectly led to another debacle for Mitchum several months later. In a February 1983 Esquire interview, he made several racist, anti-Semitic and sexist statements, including, when asked if the Holocaust occurred, responded "so the Jews say." Following the widespread negative response, he apologized a month later, saying that his statements were "prankish" and "foreign to my principle". He claimed that the problem had begun when he recited a racist monologue from his role in That Championship Season, the writer believing the words to be his own. Mitchum, who claimed that he had only reluctantly agreed to the interview, then decided to "string... along" the writer with even more incendiary statements.

Reception, acting style and legacy

Mitchum is regarded by some critics as one of the finest actors of the Golden Age of Hollywood. Roger Ebert called him "the soul of film noir". Mitchum, however, was self-effacing; in an interview with Barry Norman for the BBC about his contribution to cinema, Mitchum stopped Norman in mid-flow and in his typical nonchalant style, said, "Look, I have two kinds of acting. One on a horse and one off a horse. That's it." He had also succeeded in annoying some of his fellow actors by voicing his puzzlement at those who viewed the profession as challenging and hard work. He is quoted as having said in the Norman interview that acting was actually very simple and that his job was to "show up on time, know his lines, hit his marks, and go home".  Mitchum had a habit of marking most of his appearances in the script with the letters "n.a.r.", which meant "no action required", and also possessed a photographic memory that allowed him to remember lines with relative ease. He was also known for his profiency with accents. Dismissive of method acting, when asked by George Peppard if he had studied it during filming of Home from the Hill, Mitchum jokingly responded that he had studied the Smirnoff method.

Mitchum's subtle and understated acting style often garnered him criticism of sleepwalking through his performances. The directors who worked with him however had nothing but praise for him. Charles Laughton, who directed him in The Night of the Hunter, considered Mitchum to be one of the best actors in the world and believed that he would have been the greatest Macbeth. John Huston felt that Mitchum was on the same pedestal of actors such as Marlon Brando, Richard Burton and Laurence Olivier. Howard Hawks praised Mitchum for being a hard worker, labeling the actor a "fraud" for pretending to not care about acting. Robert De Niro, Clint Eastwood, Michael Madsen and Mark Rylance have cited Mitchum as one of their favorite actors.

His close friend and co-star on four movies, Deborah Kerr, commented on his acting abilities: "He makes acting seem like it's absolutely real. There's no acting to it at all. It's like falling off a log for him." Jane Greer, his co-star in Out of the Past and The Big Steal, said of him: "Bob would never be caught acting. He just is."

AFI's 100 Years...100 Stars lists Mitchum as the 23rd-greatest male star of classic Hollywood cinema.  AFI also recognized his performances as the menacing rapist Max Cady and Reverend Harry Powell as the 28th and 29th greatest screen villains of all time as part of AFI's 100 Years...100 Heroes and Villains. He provided the voice of the famous American Beef Council commercials that touted "Beef ... it's what's for dinner", from 1992 until his death.

A "Mitchum's Steakhouse" operated in Trappe, Maryland, where Mitchum and his family lived from 1959 to 1965.

Documentaries
 2017 : James Stewart/Robert Mitchum: The Two Faces of America directed by Gregory Monro

Filmography

References

Citations

General sources 

 Mitchum, John. Them Ornery Mitchum Boys: The Adventures of Robert and John Mitchum. Pacifica, California: Creatures at Large, 1989. .
 Olson, James and Randy Roberts. John Wayne: American. Lincoln, Nebraska: Bison Books, 1997. .
 O'Steen, Sam. Cut to the Chase: Forty-Five Years of Editing America's Favorite Movies. Los Angeles: Michael Wiese Productions, 2002. .
 Roberts, Jerry. Mitchum: In His Own Words. New York: Limelight Editions, 2000. .
 Server, Lee. Robert Mitchum: "Baby, I Don't Care". New York: St Martin's Press, 2001. .
 Sound, Owen. TCM Film Guide: Leading Men: The 50 Most Unforgettable Actors of the Studio Era. San Francisco, California: Chronicle Books, 2006. .
 Tomkies, Mike. The Robert Mitchum Story: "It Sure Beats Working". New York: Ballantine Books, 1972. .

External links

 
 
 Profile at Turner Classic Movies
 Photographs and literature
 

1917 births
1997 deaths
20th Century Studios contract players
20th-century American male actors
20th-century American memoirists
20th-century American male singers
20th-century American singers
American country singer-songwriters
American male composers
American male film actors
American male poets
American Methodists
American baritones
American people of English descent
American people of Irish descent
American people of Norwegian descent
American people of Scotch-Irish descent
American people of Scottish descent
California Republicans
Capitol Records artists
Cecil B. DeMille Award Golden Globe winners
Civilian Conservation Corps people
Combat medics
Connecticut Republicans
Deaths from emphysema
Deaths from lung cancer in California
Haaren High School alumni
Male actors from Bridgeport, Connecticut
Male Western (genre) film actors
Military personnel from Bridgeport, Connecticut
Military personnel from Connecticut
Mitchum family
Monument Records artists
Overturned convictions in the United States
People from Hell's Kitchen, Manhattan
RKO Pictures contract players
United States Army personnel of World War II
United States Army soldiers
Singer-songwriters from New York (state)